Go for It may refer to:

Music 
 Go for It (Stiff Little Fingers album), 1981
 Go for It (compilation album), a 1983 Australian compilation album by various artists, which peaked at number 1 on the Australian charts
 Go for It... Live!, a 2003 album by Fu Manchu
 Go for It (Shalamar album), 1981
 "The Second Time", a 1984 single by Kim Wilde, re-titled "Go for It" for the North American market
 "Go for It" (song), a 1987 single by English football team Coventry City
 "Go for it [Heart and Fire]", a 1990 single by Joey B. Ellis from the soundtrack to Rocky V

Other media 
 Go4It, a UK children's magazine radio programme
 Go for It! Roadshow, a children's health educational roadshow produced by HealthSouth Corporation
 Go for It (1983 film) (Nati con la camicia), a 1983 film starring Terence Hill and Bud Spencer
 Go for It! (2011 film), a 2011 film starring Aimee Garcia
 Vivir intentando (English: Go for It), a 2003 Argentine film starring the members of the girl group Bandana
 Vivir Intentando, an album by Bandana
 Go for It, Baby (German: Zur Sache, Schätzchen), a 1968 West German comedy film
 Go for it!, a Parker Brothers board game
 Go for It (game show), a British TV game show

See also
 "Young Guns (Go for It)", a 1982 single by Wham!, and the B-side, "Going for It"
 Just Do It, a trademark of shoe company Nike
 Impulsivity